SS Kyokusei Maru (Kanji:) was a  transport ship of the Imperial Japanese Army during World War II.

Built by J. Coughlan & Sons, Vancouver and launched in June 1920, as Margaret Coughlan for the Western Canada Steamship Company. She was renamed Chilcop in 1924, Shun Hwa in 1936, and Kyokusei Maru in 1938.

She left Rabaul, New Britain on 1 March 1943, as part of Operation 81, carrying a cargo 1,200 troops of the 115th Infantry Regiment, equipment, fuel, landing craft and ammunition for Lae, New Guinea. The convoy was attacked by aircraft of the United States Army Air Forces and Royal Australian Air Force from 2 March 1943, known as the Battle of the Bismarck Sea. The destroyers Yukikaze and Asagumo plucked 950 survivors from the water. The two destroyers landed the survivors at Lae. The rest of the 486 soldiers and sailors on board were killed.

Notes

References

1920 ships
Ships built in British Columbia
Maritime incidents in March 1943
Ships sunk by US aircraft
World War II merchant ships of Japan
Shipwrecks in the Bismarck Sea